"O.G. Bitch" (short for "Original Bitch") is a song by Canadian singer/songwriter Esthero. It reached number 1 on the American Dance Club Songs chart.

Composition
The song is classified as a house song. Lyrically, the song details a woman who acts inauthentic.

Release
The song was released in Canada and the United States as a CD single that included several remixes of the song, in addition to a B-side entitled "I Love You." The single was also released as a 12" record, featuring the original version of the song and an instrumental version.

Commercial performance
Upon its release, "O.G. Bitch" became Esthero's highest-charting song on two Billboard charts, and became one of the biggest Dance Club hits of 2004. "O.G. Bitch" spent 15 weeks on Billboards Dance Club Songs (previously called the Hot Dance Music/Club Play chart) chart, reaching number 1. It was her first and only song to reach the summit of that chart. Additionally, the song reached number 8 on the American Dance Singles Sales chart.

Charts

Weekly charts

Year-end chart

References

2004 singles
Esthero songs
Reprise Records singles
House music songs
Songs written by Esthero
2004 songs